Lansdale station, also known as the Lansdale Transportation Center, is a SEPTA Regional Rail station in Lansdale, Pennsylvania. Located at Main Street (PA 63) and Green Street, it serves the Lansdale/Doylestown Line. It was originally built in 1902 by the Reading Company, opening on February 7, 1903; a freight house was added in 1909. Historically, the station hosted the Interstate Express (north to Syracuse) and the Scranton Flyer (north to Scranton). Additionally, the station served commuter trains on the Reading's branch to Bethlehem until service was ended in 1981. The historic station building was listed on the National Register of Historic Places in 2021.

In FY 2013, Lansdale station had a weekday average of 1396 boardings and 1272 alightings.

The station features a 178-space parking lot and a 660-space parking garage. The parking garage at Lansdale station opened on April 17, 2017, offering hundreds of additional parking spaces at the station. Lansdale station is near the SEPTA's 25 Hz Traction Power System plant, originally built by the RDG. The station interior was formerly home to an internet café, and Italian deli called "A Little Something Nice".

Lansdale station was formerly an important transfer point between electric and Budd Rail Diesel Car (RDCs) service to points north, such as Quakertown, Bethlehem, and Allentown. RDC service on the Bethlehem Line was eliminated in 1981 due to budget cuts. Proposals for service restoration to Quakertown have been floated around since the late 1990s, but nothing has gone past the discussion phase. Service restoration beyond Quakertown is no longer generally considered a feasible option, due to SEPTA's leasing of the railroad right-of-way for use as an interim walking trail beyond Quakertown.

The station was listed on the National Register of Historic Places on December 13, 2021 as the Philadelphia & Reading Railway: Lansdale Passenger Station.

Station layout

Gallery

References

External links

SEPTA – Lansdale Station
JPMueller99 Flickr Photos #1 and #2
 Station from Main Street from Google Maps Street View

Lansdale, Pennsylvania
SEPTA Regional Rail stations
Former Reading Company stations
Railway stations in Montgomery County, Pennsylvania
Stations on the SEPTA Main Line
Railway stations in the United States opened in 1903
National Register of Historic Places in Montgomery County, Pennsylvania